Jack Bytel (born 14 March 2000) is an Australian rules footballer playing for the St Kilda Football Club in the Australian Football League (AFL). He was recruited by St Kilda with the 41st pick in the 2018 AFL draft.

Early life
Bytel was born in Aberfeldie, Victoria and participated in the Auskick program there and played junior football for the nearby Maribyrnong Park Football Club, before joining the Aberfeldie Football Club in 2013. He attended high school at Maribyrnong College as part of the schools selective sports academy. Bytel played for the Calder Cannons (where he was co-captain) for two seasons, playing sixteen games during his time at the club. In 2017 he averaged 27 possessions in the TAC Cup as a 17-year-old, and was compared to Sydney's Josh Kennedy. During his seasons with the Cannons, Bytel kicked 10 goals and averaged 25.2 disposals per game. He was selected to represent Vic Metro in the AFL Under 18 Championships in both 2017 and 2018, but stress fractures in his back restricted him to just four games over the two seasons, including three in 2018. Prior to his injury, Bytel had been tipped to be top-10 draft selection.

AFL career

Bytel was selected by the Saints, who were aware of his existing back injury. As a result, in January 2019, Bytel underwent surgery to repair a bulging disk in his lower back. The surgery ruled him out for the 2019 season, the Saints took a conservative approach with the youngster. 

On debut, Bytel picked up 18 disposals, 2 marks and 2 tackles. He played the following two games, before being omitted for the remainder of the season. Bytel signed a two-year contract extension at the conclusion of the season, tying him to the Saints until the end of the 2022 season.

Bytel played the first two games of the 2021 season, but was omitted for round three. He reclaimed a place in round four where he had 19 disposals and seven tackles. Bytel had a career-best game in round seven against Hawthorn, collecting 21 disposals and 10 tackles in the Saints' 69-point win. Bytel suffered a concussion at training leading into the Round 15 match, meaning Bytel had to observe the 12-day concussion rule.

Statistics
 Statistics are correct to the end of 2021

|- style="background-color: #eaeaea"
! scope="row" style="text-align:center" | 2019
|  || 23 || 0 || — || — || — || — || — || — || — || — || — || — || — || — || — || —
|- style="background-color: #EAEAEA"
! scope="row" style="text-align:center" | 2020
|style="text-align:center;"|
| 23 || 3 || 0 || 0 || 9 || 30 || 39 || 3 || 8 || 0.0 || 0.0 || 3.0 || 10.0 || 13.0 || 1.0 || 2.7
|- style="background-color: #eaeaea"
! scope="row" style="text-align:center" | 2021
|  || 23 || 13 || 2 || 1 || 70 || 79 || 149 || 18 || 55 || 0.15 || 0.08 || 5.38 || 6.08 || 11.46 || 1.38 || 4.23
|- style="background:#EAEAEA; font-weight:bold; width:2em"
| scope="row" text-align:center class="sortbottom" colspan=3 | Career
| 16
| 2
| 1
| 79
| 109
| 188
| 21
| 63
| 0.13
| 0.06
| 4.94
| 6.81
| 11.75
| 1.31
| 3.94
|}

References

2000 births
Living people
St Kilda Football Club players
Australian rules footballers from Melbourne
Calder Cannons players
People from the City of Moonee Valley